Alfred Armand Adolf von Steiger, commonly known as Adolf von Steiger (25 July 1859 – 1 March 1925) was a Swiss Politician from the Free Democratic Party of Switzerland (FDP) and jurist, who served as the sixth Chancellor from 1919 to 1925.

The son of a librarian from an old Bernese patrician family, he studied law at the Universities of Bern, Geneva, and Leipzig. From 1884 to 1893 he led a law practice in Bern. After two years as a substitute judge, he was a member of the Bernese court from 1893. In 1900 he was elected as a representative of the Liberals for mayor of Bern. He also served on the Grand Council of the canton of Bern and the Council of States (1908-1918).

In 1918 he was named Vice Chancellor. The following year, the Federal Assembly elected him Chancellor. He stood up to the Catholic conservative Solothurn National Council and Siegfried Hartmann. On taking office he also passed a new law that relieved the Chancellor of the record keeping in the National Council. He died of a stroke in 1925 while in office.

References
 
 

Federal Chancellors of Switzerland
1859 births
1925 deaths
Mayors of Bern
19th-century Swiss judges
Leipzig University alumni
University of Geneva alumni
University of Bern alumni
20th-century Swiss politicians